Steven Fenton (birth unknown), also known by the nickname of "Fizzer", is an English former professional rugby league footballer who played in the 1970s and 1980s.

Playing career

International honours
Steve Fenton won caps for England while at Castleford in 1981 against France, and Wales.

County Cup Final appearances
Steve Fenton played , i.e. number 5, in Castleford's 17-7 victory over Featherstone Rovers in the 1977 Yorkshire County Cup Final during the 1977–78 season at Headingley Rugby Stadium, Leeds on Saturday 15 October 1977, played right-, i.e. number 3, in the 10-5 victory over Bradford Northern in the 1981 Yorkshire County Cup Final during the 1981–82 season at Headingley Rugby Stadium, Leeds on Saturday 3 October 1981, and played , i.e. number 2, in the 2-13 defeat by Hull F.C. in the 1983 Yorkshire County Cup Final during the 1983–84 season at Elland Road, Leeds on Saturday 15 October 1983.

BBC2 Floodlit Trophy Final appearances
Steve Fenton played , i.e. number 2, in Castleford's 12-4 victory over Leigh in the 1976 BBC2 Floodlit Trophy Final during the 1976–77 season at Hilton Park, Leigh on Tuesday 14 December 1976.

Player's No.6 Trophy Final appearances
Steve Fenton played , i.e. number 2, in Castleford's 25-15 victory over Blackpool Borough in the 1976–77 Player's No.6 Trophy Final during the 1976–77 season at The Willows, Salford on Saturday 22 January 1977.

Career records
Castleford's most tries scored in a match record is 5-tries, and is jointly held by; Derek Foster against Hunslet on 10 November 1972, John Joyner against Millom on 16 September 1973, Stephen Fenton against Dewsbury on 27 January 1978, Ian French against Hunslet on 9 February 1986, and St. John Ellis against Whitehaven on 10 December 1989.

References

External links
Profile at thecastlefordtigers.co.uk

Living people
Castleford Tigers players
England national rugby league team players
English rugby league players
Place of birth missing (living people)
Rugby league wingers
Year of birth missing (living people)